Peter Zijerveld (born 16 March 1955) is a Dutch former professional racing cyclist and triathlete. He rode in one edition of the Tour de France and two editions of the Vuelta a España.

In 1983 NIKE asked him to ride triathlons profesionally. He went to San Diego where he exchanged knowledge about cycling, learned how to swim (better) and bought an aerodynamic helmet. Back in the Netherlands he put his helmet on in the first triathlon he rode. Its package didn't have an instruction, so he put the helmet on backwards! 'We were all pioneers.'

Main results
1979
 1st Omloop het Volk amateurs
1980
 25th general classification 1980 Vuelta a España
 2nd in stage 15 of the 1980 Vuelta
 4th in stage 12 of the 1980 Vuelta
 10th in stage 16a of the 1980 Vuelta
 8th Grand Prix Pino Cerami
1981
 1st Mountain classification Vuelta a Andalucía
 5th general classification 1981 Paris–Nice
 7th in stage 4 of the 1981 Paris-Nice
 8th in stage 9 of the 1981 Paris-Nice
 15th general classification 1981 Vuelta a España
 6th in stage 17 of the 1981 Vuelta
 9th in stage 14 of the 1981 Vuelta
 9th in stage 15a of the 1981 Vuelta
1983
 3rd Dutch National Championships Triathlon in Almere
1985
 1st European Championships Triathlon middle distance in Aabenraa - 4:10.05
 1st Triathlon of Veenendaal - 4:12.41

References

External links

1955 births
Living people
Dutch male cyclists
People from Uithoorn
Cyclists from North Holland